Bajram "Bajro" Župić (Serbian Cyrillic: Бајрам Бајро Жупић; born January 21, 1960) is a former Serbian football player and a football manager.

Career
He started playing in his hometown club FK Novi Pazar and after only one season competing as senior, got an invitation to play for the giants FK Partizan. As a very solid defender, sometimes too hard on some opponents, he soon won the respect and the hearts of the club most loyal fans, the Grobari. Also known for his simplicity and humor, there were many anecdotes built around him, but mostly for his courage and for giving it all at the field, he started to have the crowd chanting songs to him, and even today the phrase "Jedan je Bajro", meaning "Bajro, the one..." is actual.

In 1990, after having played 247 official matches for Partizan, he moved to Austrian club DSV Alpine where he played the 1990-91 season.

After retiring from playing, he has dedicated working with FK Novi Pazar at many levels.

He also runs a football school with his name in Novi Pazar, being Adem Ljajić his latest high-profile product.

References

External links
 Profile at Playerhistory

Living people
1960 births
Sportspeople from Novi Pazar
Bosniaks of Serbia
Yugoslav footballers
Serbian footballers
Serbian football managers
FK Novi Pazar players
FK Partizan players
Expatriate footballers in Austria
Association football defenders
FK Novi Pazar managers
DSV Leoben players
Yugoslav First League players
Serbian expatriate footballers